The Fish Island Site is a historic site south of St. Augustine, Florida. It is the site of one of Florida's earliest fruit plantations, and was established by Jesse Fish, from New York, who acquired the property in 1763. The plantation produced oranges, figs, peaches, pomegranates and limes. It is located on the Matanzas River. On June 13, 1972, it was added to the U.S. National Register of Historic Places.

See also
Fish Island (disambiguation), for other places by this name

References

External links
 St. Johns County listings at National Register of Historic Places
 St. Johns County listings at Florida's Office of Cultural and Historical Programs
 Visit St. Augustine website

National Register of Historic Places in St. Johns County, Florida